The Aucilla River rises in Brooks County, Georgia, USA, close to Thomasville, and passes through the Big Bend region of Florida, emptying into the Gulf of Mexico at Apalachee Bay. Some early maps called it the Ocilla River. Tributaries include the Little Aucilla and Wacissa Rivers. In Florida, the Aucilla River forms the eastern border of Jefferson County, separating it from Madison County on the northern part, and from Taylor County to the south.

During the first Spanish period in Florida the Aucilla River was the boundary between the Apalachee people and the Timucua-speaking Yustaga (or Uzachile) people. The name "Aucilla" refers to an old Timucua village.

Course and features

The Aucilla River flows across a karst landscape, disappearing underground and then reappearing, first at Howell Sinks near Boston, Georgia, and then approximately 30 times in the area known as the Aucilla River Sinks on the lower part of the river. Between the Florida-Georgia State line and U.S. Highway 90 the river flows through an area of springs, sinkholes and marshes without a main channel. From U.S. 90 to a few miles south of Lamont the river flows in a steep-sided valley with whitewater rapids. The Aucilla River Sinks, where many segments of the river are underground, starts north of Goose Pasture Road and runs to where the Wacissa River joins the Aucilla. The final few miles of the Aucilla below the mouth of the Wacissa flows over a broad floodplain.

Although the Wacissa River is the largest tributary of the Aucilla River, it breaks into a number of braided channels before reaching the Aucilla. In the first half of the 19th Century cotton growers of Jefferson and Madison Counties wanted to carry their cotton to sea ports on the coast, but the intermittent underground segments of the Aucilla River and the narrow and shallow braided channels of the lower Wacissa did not permit the passage of barges. The Wacissa and Aucilla Navigation Company was chartered in 1831 to dig a canal from the navigable portion of the Wacissa to below Nuttall Rise, where the Aucilla returns above ground for the last time before reaching the Gulf of Mexico. Construction of the canal did not start until 1851. Slaves from local plantations were hired from their owners to dig the canal, which was cut through limestone. Work on the canal was halted in 1856, while parts of the canal were still too shallow for loaded barges. By that time, railroads had reached the plantation country, removing the urgency of the need for the canal. In the 21st Century, a proposal to rename the Slave Canal proved to be unpopular and failed. Today, the Slave Canal is a popular paddling trail maintained by the state of Florida.

Fossils and ancient people
The Aucilla River is a rich source of late Pleistocene and early Holocene animal bones and human artifacts. Close to 40 underwater archaeological sites have been identified in the river. The Florida Museum of Natural History's Aucilla River Prehistory Project studied several of the sites for 15 years, ending in 1998. The Page/Ladson site, which 
was examined again in 2012-2014 by a group sponsored by the Center for the Study of First Americans,
 is one of the best documented and earliest of pre-Clovis culture sites in North America. As of 2006, the Sloth Hole site was "believed to be one of the three oldest Clovis sites in the Americas." More than half of the "academically known worked ivory in the New World" has been collected from Sloth Hole. In the early 2000s, the Paleo Aucilla project led by Dr. Michael Faught investigated the Aucilla River (the PaleoAucilla) that has been submerged by the rise in sea level since the late Pleistocene Epoch. Two important sites have been found in the ancient channel of the Aucilla River that are now underwater in Apalachee Bay, the J&J Hunt and Ontolo sites. Currently, Dr. Jessi Halligan from Florida State University leads the effort to study the Pleistocene conditions of the Aucilla River.

Crossings

See also 
 List of fossil sites (with link directory)
 South Atlantic-Gulf Water Resource Region

References

Further reading
Balfour, R. C. 2002. In Search of the Aucilla. Colson Printing Company, Valdosta, GA.
Balsillie, J. H., G. H. Means, and J. S. Dunbar. 2006. The Ryan/Harley site: Sedimentology of an inundated Paleoindian site in north Florida. Geoarchaeology 21:363-391.
Dunbar, J. S. 2006. Pleistocene-Holocene Climate Change: Chronostratigraphy and Geoclimate of the Southeast United States, Chapter 5. Pages 103-158 in S. D. Webb, ed. First Floridians and Last Mastodons: the Page-Ladson Site on the Aucilla River. Springer Press, Dordrecht, The Netherlands.
Dunbar, J. S., C. A. Hemmings, P. K. Vojnovski, S. D. Webb, and W. Stanton. 2005. The Ryan/Harley Site 8Je1004: A Suwannee Point Site In The Wacissa River, North Florida. Pages 81–96 in R. Bonnichsen, B. T. Lepper, D. J. Stanford, and M. R. Waters, eds. Paleoamerican origins: beyond Clovis. Center for the Study of the First Americans, Texas A&M University Press, College Station, TX.
Dunbar, J. S., S. D. Webb, and M. K. Faught. 1988. Page/Ladson (8Je591): An Underwater Paleo-Indian Site in Northwestern Florida. Florida Anthropologist 41:442-452.
Fisher, D. C. and D. L. Fox. 2006. Five Years in the Life of an Aucilla River Mastodon. Pages 343-377 in S. D. Webb, ed. First Floridians and Last Mastodons: the Page-Ladson Site on the Aucilla River. Springer, Dordrecht, the Netherlands.
Hoppe, K. A. and P. Koch. 2006. The Biogeochemistry of the Aucilla River Fauna, Chapter 13. Pages 379-401 in S. D. Webb, ed. First Floridians and Last Mastodons: the Page-Ladson Site on the Aucilla River. Springer Press, Dordrecht, The Netherlands.
Hoppe, K. A. and P. L. Koch. 2007. Reconstructing the migration patterns of late Pleistocene mammals from northern Florida, USA. Quaternary Research 68:347-352.
Newsom, L. A. and M. Mihlbachler. 2006. Mastodons (Mammut americanum) Diet Foraging Patterns Based on Analysis of Dung Deposits, Chapter 10. Pages 263-331 in S. D. Webb, ed. First Floridians and Last Mastodons: the Page-Ladson Site on the Aucilla River. Springer Press, Dordrecht, The Netherlands.
Newsom, L. A. 2006. Paleoenvironmental Aspects of the Macrophytic Plant Assemblage from Page-Ladson, Chapter 7. Pages 181-211 in S. D. Webb, ed. First Floridians and Last Mastodons: the Page-Ladson Site on the Aucilla River. Springer Press,  Dordrecht, The Netherlands.
Serbousek, D. 1983. Explorations of a Paleo-Indian site on the Aucilla River. Florida Anthropologist 36:88-97.
Webb, S. D. 1974. Underwater Paleontology of Florida's Rivers. National Geographic Society Research Reports 1968 Projects:479-481.
Webb, S. D. 2006. First Floridians and last Mastodons: the Page-Ladson site in the Aucilla River. Springer, Dordrecht, The Netherlands.
Webb, S. D. and J. S. Dunbar. 2006. Carbon Dates, Chapter 4. Pages 83–102 in S. D. Webb, ed. First Floridians and Last Mastodons: the Page-Ladson Site on the Aucilla River. Springer Press, Dordrecht, The Netherlands.
Webb, S. D. and C. A. Hemmings. 2001. Ivory and bone tools from late Pleistocene deposits in the Aucilla and Wacissa River, North-Central Florida. Pages 1–8 in B. A. Purdy, ed. Enduring records: the environmental and cultural heritage of wetlands. Oxbow Books, Oxford, England.
Webb, S. D., J. T. Milanich, R. Alexon, and J. S. Dunbar. 1984. A Bison antiquus Kill Site, Wacissa River, Jefferson County, Florida. American Antiquity 49:384-392.

Bodies of water of Jefferson County, Florida
Bodies of water of Madison County, Florida
Rivers of Florida
Rivers of Georgia (U.S. state)
Rivers of Taylor County, Florida
Outstanding Florida Waters
Subterranean rivers of the United States